The Moroni Opera House, at 325 W. Main St. in Moroni, Utah, was built in 1890–91.  It was listed on the National Register of Historic Places in 1996.

It is a rectangular stone and brick building  in plan.  The former wooden stage, which projected  beyond, no longer remains.

References

Theatres on the National Register of Historic Places in Utah
Theatres completed in 1890
Sanpete County, Utah
Opera houses